Deforestation in Laos is a major environmental concern, with Laos losing forest area to legal and illegal logging.

Illegal logging
In 2020, more than 2,600 cubic metres of illegally harvested wood and over 290 tonnes of illicit timber were seized. Authorities inspected wood processing plants and found 2,788 were in violation of governmental restrictions. Some 1,636 plants which failed to operate lawfully were shut down.

Commercial interest in the forest 
Timber products targeted for logging in Laos includes ironwood, mahogany, pine, redwood, and teak—and other forestry products—benzoin (resin), charcoal, and sticklac.

The forest has also been an important source of wild foods, herbal medicines, and timber for house construction and even into the 1990s continues to be a valued reserve of natural products for noncommercial household consumption. Since the mid-1980s widespread commercial harvesting of timber for the export market has disrupted the traditional gathering of forest products in a number of locations and contributed to extremely rapid deforestation throughout the country.

Agriculture 

Slash-and-burn agriculture was practiced by approximately one million farmers in 1990. Slash-and-burn agriculture is highly destructive to the forest environment, because it entails shifting from old to new plots of land to allow exhausted soil to rejuvenate, a process that is estimated to require at least four to six years.

Government efforts to preserve valuable hardwoods for commercial extraction have led to measures to prohibit slash-and-burn agriculture throughout the country. Government restrictions on clearing forests for slash-and-burn cropping in the late 1980s, along with attempts to gradually resettle upland slash-and-burn farming villages to lowland locations suitable for paddy rice cultivation had significant effects on upland villages.

History 

Timber resources have been commercially exploited on a small scale since the colonial period and are an important source of foreign exchange. In 1988 wood products accounted for more than one-half of all export earnings. In 1992 timber and wood products were almost one-third of the total principal exports.

In the 1950s, forests covered 70 percent of the land area in Laos. By 1992, according to government estimates, forest coverage had decreased by nearly one-third, to just 47 percent of total land area. , governmental policy is to restore forest cover to 70 percent of the nation's landmass.

Deforestation increased steadily throughout the 1980s, at an annual average rate of about 1.2 percent in the first half of the decade according to the United Nations (UN) and other monitoring agencies. This rate represents the destruction of about 150,000 to 160,000 hectares annually, as compared with annual reforestation of about 2,000 hectares. The government, however, reported a deforestation rate double this figure. Deforestation results from clearing forestland for shifting cultivation, removing logs for industrial uses and fuel, and the export of exotic hardwoods.

The volume of logs (roundwood) removed for industrial purposes increased by about 70 percent between 1975–1977 and 1985–1987, to about 330,000 m3. However, this volume was dwarfed by that removed for domestic (fuel) purposes. Between 1980 and 1989, the volume of logs removed for fuel increased by about 25 percent, to about 3.7 million m3; only about 100,000 m3 were removed for industrial purposes. By 1991 these figures had increased to approximately 3.9 million m3 and 106,000 m3, respectively.

Following the introduction of the New Economic Mechanism, decentralization of forest management to autonomous forest enterprises at the provincial level encouraged increased exploitation of forests. At the central and provincial levels, autonomous forest enterprises are responsible for forest management.

Legislation 

The government moved to reconcile its opposing objectives of decentralized forestry management and environmental protection. In January 1989, the government imposed a ban on logging—initially announced in January 1988 as a ban on the export of unprocessed wood—although exemptions are granted on a case-by-case basis. This measure was followed by the imposition of high export taxes on timber and other wood products, included in the June 1989 tax reforms.

Toward the end of 1989, logging was again permitted, but only based on quotas extended to individual forestry enterprises. In response to the restrictions, production of unprocessed logs, both roundwood or timber decreased slightly in 1989. However, according to the Asian Development Bank, production more than recovered the following year.

The effect of the restrictions is most clearly shown in the export statistics for 1989—exports of timber and wood products had decreased by 30 percent from the previous year. In 1991 a new decree banned all logging until further notice, in hopes of controlling widespread illegal logging and subsequent environmental destruction. However, there was little practical impact, and illegal logging remains widespread. The smuggling of logs to Thailand also is significant.

Prime Minister Thongloun Sisoulith on 13 May 2016 issued Prime Minister's Order No. 15 which banned the export of unfinished wood products including timber and logs.

Illicit military involvement 
The area of the Luang Prabang Range, at the border between Laos and Thailand, is allegedly rife with military involvement in the timber trade.

See also 
 Wildlife of Laos

References

Further reading
 

Forestry in Laos
Deforestation by region
Environmental issues in Laos